Joan Orenstein (December 4, 1923 – October 10, 2009) was a British-born Canadian actress, primarily on stage, although she performed in other media. One of her best-known roles was in the 1997 film The Hanging Garden as the dotty old grandmother, Grace.

Acting career
Joan Travell was born in 1923 in London, and emigrated to Canada in the 1940s after World War II.

She acted across Canada but mostly acted for Halifax's Neptune Theatre. She also performed lead roles on most of the major Canadian stages, including the Centaur Theatre, the National Arts Centre, the Belfry Theatre, the Tarragon Theatre, Theatre Calgary, the Shaw Festival, the Canadian Stage and the Manitoba Theatre Centre. She also performed on television, in film, on radio and in the recording industry.

Family
She was married to Henry Orenstein, an artist and CBC production designer. They had five daughters, including actress Sarah Orenstein, a Dora Award winner, dancer Cia Tweel , designer Edie Orenstein, flutist Ruth Orenstein

Awards

Atlantic Film Festival
Atlantic Canadian Award Best Acting - Female (winner) for: The Hanging Garden (1997)
Atlantic Canadian Award  Outstanding Performance by an Actress (winner) for: The Event (2003)

Genie Awards
Genie Best Performance by an Actress in a Supporting Role (nominated) for: The Hanging Garden (1997)

Theatre work
Centaur Theatre
Juno and the Paycock
People Are Living There
Stone Angel
Road to Mecca
Albertine in Five Times
La Sagouine
National Arts Centre
Waiting for the Parade
Mother Courage
Ghosts
Neptune Theatre
Forever Yours
Marie-Lou
Memories of You
Canadian Stage
Odd Jobs
Belfry Theatre
The Magnificent Voyage of Emily Carr
If We Are Women
Tarragon Theatre
Mrs. Klein (with daughter Sarah Orenstein)
Theatre Calgary
Transit of Venus
Shaw Festival
Mrs. Warren's Profession
Hedda Gabler
Manitoba Theatre Centre
night, Mother
Vancouver East Cultural Centre
Song of this Place (with daughter Sarah Orenstein)

Filmography
Charlie Grant's War - 1985
Henry & Verlin - 1994
Never Too Late - 1996
The Hanging Garden - 1997
Emily of New Moon: Eye of Heaven & Storms of the Heart - 1998
Emily of New Moon: Paradise Lost & The Enchanted Doll - 1998
Emily of New Moon: The Wild Rover, The Ghost of Whyther Grange & A Child Shall Lead Them - 1998
Emily of New Moon: A Winter's Tale & The Sound of Silence - 1998
Baba's House - 2002
Shattered City: The Halifax Explosion - 2003
The Event - 2003
Hunger Point - 2003

References

External links

1923 births
2009 deaths
Canadian film actresses
Canadian stage actresses
Canadian television actresses
British emigrants to Canada
Actresses from London